Josef Walter (27 October 1925 – 16 March 1992) was an Austrian footballer. He competed in the men's tournament at the 1952 Summer Olympics.

References

External links
 
 

1925 births
1992 deaths
Austrian footballers
Austria international footballers
Olympic footballers of Austria
Footballers at the 1952 Summer Olympics
Footballers from Vienna
Association football midfielders
Austrian football managers
Austria national football team managers
Wiener Sport-Club players
First Vienna FC players
1. Simmeringer SC players